The 2010 American Le Mans Series powered by eStar was the seventh round of the 2010 American Le Mans Series season. It took place at Road America on August 22, 2010.

Qualifying

Qualifying result
Pole position winners in each class are marked in bold.

Race

Race result
Class winners in bold.  Cars failing to complete 70% of their class winner's distance are marked as Not Classified (NC).

References

Road America 500
Road America
2010 in sports in Wisconsin